Diego de Souza Gama Silva, or simply Diego Souza (born March 22, 1984 in São Paulo), is a Brazilian midfielder. He plays for Taboão da Serra.

Club Stats
Updated to 23 February 2016.

Honours
Palmeiras
Brazilian Série B: 2003

References

External links

1984 births
Living people
Brazilian footballers
Brazilian expatriate footballers
Campeonato Brasileiro Série B players
Sociedade Esportiva Palmeiras players
Joinville Esporte Clube players
Expatriate footballers in Japan
J1 League players
J2 League players
Vissel Kobe players
Kashiwa Reysol players
Tokyo Verdy players
Kyoto Sanga FC players
Vegalta Sendai players
Montedio Yamagata players
América Futebol Clube (RN) players
Expatriate footballers in Mexico
Association football midfielders
Pan American Games medalists in football
Pan American Games silver medalists for Brazil
Footballers at the 2003 Pan American Games
Medalists at the 2003 Pan American Games
Footballers from São Paulo (state)